Fabián E. Bustamante is an Argentinian-American computer scientist specializing in distributed systems and computer networking. He is currently a professor of computer science at Northwestern University.

Career
Fabián E. Bustamante was born and raised in Argentina. After completing his Licencitura at Universidad Nacional de la Patagonia San Juan Bosco, he earned a Ph.D. specializing in distributed systems from the Georgia Institute of Technology under Karsten Schwan.

He is best known for his work on peer-to-peer systems and content delivery networks  (particularly Ono (P2P)) and for his tool for optimizing DNS performance .  He has authored more than 50 papers in various areas of Computer Science. and released over 10 publicly available systems resulting from his research work.

Education
 Ph.D., Computer Science, 2001. Georgia Institute of Technology.
 Licenciatura, Computer Science, 1993.  Universidad Nacional de la Patagonia San Juan Bosco.

References

External links
 Personal web page 
 Research group web page 

Living people
American computer scientists
Argentine computer scientists
Georgia Tech alumni
Northwestern University faculty
Year of birth missing (living people)
National University of Patagonia San Juan Bosco alumni